is a railway station located in the city of  Kakamigahara,  Gifu Prefecture,  Japan, operated by the private railway operator Meitetsu.

Lines

Station layout
Unumajuku Station has one ground-level island platform connected to the station building by a level crossing. The station is unattended.

Platforms

Adjacent stations

|-
!colspan=5|Nagoya Railroad

History
Unumajuku Station opened on September 20, 1927.

Surrounding area
Kakaigahara Public Swimming Pool

See also
 List of Railway Stations in Japan

External links

  

Railway stations in Japan opened in 1926
Stations of Nagoya Railroad
Railway stations in Gifu Prefecture
Kakamigahara, Gifu